

The Wilcox Octagon House is a historic home in Camillus, New York, USA, that was built in 1856 and was listed on the National Register of Historic Places in 1983. It was the farmhouse home of Isaiah Wilcox, who had a  farm. It is an octagon house of the type advocated by Orson Fowler, who wrote an influential book promoting use of octagonal home designs.

It is located at 5420 West Genesee Street in Camillus.

Photos

See also
 List of Registered Historic Places in Onondaga County, New York
 Octagon House (disambiguation)

References

External links

Octagon House, at Town of Camillus

Octagon houses in New York (state)
Historic house museums in New York (state)
Houses in Onondaga County, New York
Museums in Onondaga County, New York
National Register of Historic Places in Onondaga County, New York
Houses on the National Register of Historic Places in New York (state)